Coryanthes hunteriana is a species of orchid. This plant can be found in Costa Rica and Panama.

References

External links

hunteriana
Orchids of Central America
Plants described in 1922